Chelaethiops elongatus is an African  species of freshwater fish in the family Cyprinidae. It is found in the Congo River basin.

References

Chelaethiops
Fish described in 1899
Taxobox binomials not recognized by IUCN